Billy Baldwin may refer to:

 Billy Baldwin (decorator) (1903–1983), New York decorator
 Bill Baldwin (footballer) (1907–1982), English footballer/soccer player
 Bill Baldwin (1935–2015), American science fiction author
 Billy Baldwin (baseball) (1951–2011), Major League Baseball outfielder
 William Baldwin (born 1963), American actor

See also
 William Baldwin (disambiguation)